Daisy Jessica Edgar-Jones (born 24 May 1998) is a British actress. She began her career with the television series Cold Feet (2016–2020) and War of the Worlds (2019–2021). 

Edgar-Jones gained wider recognition for her starring role in the miniseries Normal People (2020), which earned her nominations for a British Academy Television Award and a Golden Globe Award. In 2022, she starred in the comedy-thriller film Fresh, the mystery film Where the Crawdads Sing, and the crime miniseries Under the Banner of Heaven for which she received another Golden Globe nomination.

Early life and education
Daisy Edgar-Jones was born in the borough of Islington, London, the daughter of Northern Irish film editor Wendy Edgar-Jones, (Sharpe; the 1999 serial version of Oliver Twist) and Scotsman Philip Edgar-Jones, director of Sky Arts and head of entertainment at Sky. She grew up in Muswell Hill, London, and first acted in a school play in Year 2. She attended The Mount School for Girls and Woodhouse College before being admitted to the National Youth Theatre. She studied with the Open University.

Career
After appearing in the 2016 Outnumbered Christmas Special on BBC One, at 17, Edgar-Jones was cast as Olivia Marsden in ITV's comedy drama Cold Feet alongside James Nesbitt. In 2018, she appeared as Jessica Thompson in Silent Witness, and in independent coming-of-age feature film Pond Life directed by Bill Buckhurst. She was in the National Youth Theatre production of The Reluctant Fundamentalist.

Edgar-Jones had a recurring role as Delia Rawson in 2019 BBC and HBO series Gentleman Jack.

Edgar-Jones played Emily Gresham for the first two seasons of War of the Worlds opposite Gabriel Byrne and Elizabeth McGovern. In May 2019, it was announced that Edgar-Jones had been cast in the main role of Marianne alongside Paul Mescal as Connell in the Hulu and BBC Three series Normal People, an adaptation of the novel by Sally Rooney.

Edgar-Jones starred in the February 2020 revival of Albion at the Almeida Theatre, which was recorded and later broadcast by the BBC that August. She appeared on British Vogue's 2020 list of influential women.

Her first post-Normal People project, the thriller dark-comedy film Fresh, premiered at the 2022 Sundance Film Festival.

In 2022, Edgar-Jones had the starring role in the film adaptation of Where the Crawdads Sing by Delia Owens and also starred in Dustin Lance Black's true crime miniseries Under the Banner of Heaven, an adaptation of Jon Krakauer's book of the same name. She was nominated for the Golden Globe Award for Best Supporting Actress – Series, Miniseries or Television Film.

Edgar-Jones was cast in the lead role for the upcoming film, Twisters, set to be released in July 2024.

Filmography

Film

Television

Theatre

Awards and nominations

References

External links

1998 births
Living people
Actresses from London
English people of Northern Ireland descent
English people of Scottish descent
National Youth Theatre members
People from Muswell Hill
People from the London Borough of Islington
21st-century English actresses
21st-century English women